Louca v German Judicial Authority is an English criminal appeal, originating in the High Court and ending in the Supreme Court in 2009.

Facts
Section 2(2)(a) of the Extradition Act 2003 provides that, “A Part 1 warrant is an arrest warrant which is issued by a judicial authority of a category 1 territory and which contains… the information referred to in subsection (4)…”

Section 2(4)(b) of the 2003 Act provides that, “The information is… (b) particulars of any other warrant issued in the category 1 territory for the person’s arrest in respect of the offence…”

Mr Locua argued that Section 2(2)(a) and (4)(b) of the Extradition Act 2003 meant it was unlawful to extradite him under an EAW which did not refer to all the previous EAWs.

Judgment

High Court

Court of Appeal

Supreme Court
The Supreme Court unanimously dismissed the appeal. Lord Mance gave the judgment of the court with Lords Hope, Rodger, Collins and Kerr concurring.

Lord Mance started by referring to the governing sections of the Extradition Act 2003 which were to be found in Part 1 of the Act (which deals with European Arrest Warrants) and went on to look at the Council Framework Decision on the European arrest warrant  issued by the European Union which was implemented in the United Kingdom via Part 1 of the Extradition Act 2003. National courts are under an obligation to interpret national law as far as possible in the light of the wording and purpose of the framework decision in order to attain the result which it pursues. In particular, Lord Mance looked at Articles 1(1), 2(1) and 8(1) as well as sections (b) and (f) of the annexed modern European Arrest Warrant. In particular, Article 8(1)(c) provides that, “The European arrest warrant shall contain the following information… (c) evidence of an enforceable judgment, an arrest warrant or any other enforceable judicial decision having the same effect, coming within the scope of Articles 1 and 2…”.

It had been argued before the Divisional Court that the phrase “any other warrant” in Section 2(4)(b) of the 2003 Act should include European arrest warrants. This argument was rejected on the basis of five points:

On this basis, the Divisional Court held that Article 8(1)(c) and Section 2(4)(b) were concerned with domestic judgments, arrest warrants or other decisions, and not with any other EAW issued in respect of the alleged offending, still less one which had been withdrawn.

At the Supreme Court, it had been argued that the fifth point was flawed and that there was a purpose to requiring evidence of any other EAWs, even if withdrawn, in that they could constitute the basis of, or be relevant to, a decision by the executing court to set side (or consider whether to set aside) the subsisting EAW as an abuse of process.

Lord Mance rejected this argument. The text in Article 8(1)(g) and section (f) of the model EAW did not oblige disclosure of previous EAWs and subsequently there was no reason to interpret Section 2(4)(b) of the 2003 Act as “intended to require the executing court to be informed by the EAw of one (and only one) point – the existence of another EAW – which might, in some conceivable case, be of some conceivable relevance to an argument of abuse of process. Furthermore, other “due factors” were covered by Sections 11 to 20 of the 2003 Act and Section 21 of the 2003 Act which provided a general safeguard that the judge must decide whether surrender would be compatible with the European Convention of Human Rights.

See also
UK human rights

Notes

Supreme Court of the United Kingdom cases
2009 in case law
2009 in British law